The 1993 California Angels season involved the Angels finishing 5th in the American League west with a record of 71 wins and 91 losses.

Offseason
November 19, 1992: Torey Lovullo was signed as a free agent with the California Angels.
November 19, 1992: Rob Ducey was released by the California Angels.
December 6, 1992: Jim Abbott was traded by the California Angels to the New York Yankees for J. T. Snow, Jerry Nielsen, and Russ Springer.
December 8, 1992: Kelly Gruber was traded by the Toronto Blue Jays with cash to the California Angels for Luis Sojo.
 December 11, 1992: Chili Davis signed as a free agent with the California Angels.
January 29, 1993: Jerome Walton was signed as a free agent with the California Angels.
February 11, 1993: Scott Sanderson was signed as a free agent with the California Angels.

Regular season
 September 17, 1993: Greg Myers of the Angels was the final strikeout victim of Nolan Ryan. It would be Ryan's 5,714th strikeout.

Season standings

Record vs. opponents

Notable transactions
June 3, 1993: Gary Gaetti was released by the California Angels.
June 17, 1993: Doug Linton was selected off waivers by the California Angels from the Toronto Blue Jays.
August 3, 1993: Scott Sanderson was selected off waivers by the San Francisco Giants from the California Angels.
August 20, 1993: Jerome Walton was released by the California Angels.
September 7, 1993: Kelly Gruber was released by the California Angels.
September 14, 1993: Doug Linton was released by the California Angels.

Roster

Player stats

Batting

Starters by position 
Note: Pos = Position; G = Games played; AB = At bats; H = Hits; Avg. = Batting average; HR = Home runs; RBI = Runs batted in

Other batters
Note: G = Games played; AB = At bats; H = Hits; Avg. = Batting average; HR = Home runs; RBI = Runs batted in

Pitching

Starting pitchers
Note: G = Games pitched; IP = Innings pitched; W = Wins; L = Losses; ERA = Earned run average; SO = Strikeouts

Other pitchers
Note: G = Games pitched; IP = Innings pitched; W = Wins; L = Losses; ERA = Earned run average; SO = Strikeouts

Relief pitchers
Note: G = Games pitched; W = Wins; L = Losses; SV = Saves; ERA = Earned run average; SO = Strikeouts

Farm system

LEAGUE CHAMPIONS: Boise

References

1993 California Angels at Baseball Reference
1993 California Angels  at Baseball Almanac

Los Angeles Angels seasons
Los
Los